Gompholobium polymorphum is a species of flowering plant in the family Fabaceae and is endemic to the south-west of Western Australia. It is a bushy, straggling shrub or climber with cylindrical leaves with longitudinal grooves and yellow, red or orange, pea-like flowers with yellow, red or orange marks.

Description

Taxonomy
Gompholobium polymorphum was first formally described in 1811 by Robert Brown in Hortus Kewensis. The specific epithet (polymorphum) means "many-shaped", referring to the variable form of this species.

Distribution and habitat
This gompholobium grows in lateritic or granitic soils in the Avon Wheatbelt, Esperance Plains, Jarrah Forest, Mallee, Swan Coastal Plain and Warren biogeographic regions of south-western Western Australia.

Conservation status
Gompholobium polymorphum is classified as "not threatened" by the Western Australian Government Department of Parks and Wildlife.

References

polymorphum
Eudicots of Western Australia
Plants described in 1811
Taxa named by Robert Brown (botanist, born 1773)